is a Japanese football player. He plays for Tochigi Uva FC.

References

External links

 Player statistics 

1986 births
Living people
Association football people from Akita Prefecture
Japanese footballers
J1 League players
J3 League players
Japan Football League players
FC Tokyo players
Gainare Tottori players
Blaublitz Akita players
Tochigi City FC players
Singapore Premier League players
Albirex Niigata Singapore FC players
Akita FC Cambiare players
Association football midfielders